Hodbarrow RSPB Reserve is a nature reserve run by the Royal Society for the Protection of Birds on the edge of the Lake District National Park in Cumbria, England. It is on the Duddon Estuary near the town of Millom.

History
The nature reserve was purchased by the RSPB in 1986. It occupies a site where iron ore was mined until the 1960s.
The mining caused subsidence. Flooding increased after the closure of the mine, as the site was no longer dewatered.
The reserve continues to be protected from the sea by a seawall built by John Aird & Co. and completed in 1905.

Habitats
Most of the area of the reserve is taken up by Hodbarrow Lagoon, a flooded part of the former mine, which is described as a "coastal lagoon". Some of the reserve is scrubland.

Facilities
There is a car park on the Millom side of the reserve from which you can walk to the seawall. (Alternatively, there is more direct pedestrian access to the seawall from Haverigg.)

There is a bird hide on the seawall which gives views of the lagoon.

Protection status
The lagoon was originally a separate Site of Special Scientific Interest, notified in 1983. Following an amalgamation of SSSIs, it is part of the Duddon Estuary Site of Special Scientific Interest.
The Duddon estuary is also an Important Bird Area, and a Special Protection Area (Morecambe Bay and Duddon Estuary SPA).

Birdlife
Hodbarrow has breeding populations of terns.  It was one of the sites involved in a project funded by the LIFE programme called "LIFE on the edge improving the condition and long-term resilience of key coastal SPAs in S, E and N England ". In the case of Hodbarrow, slag was moved to create a new island in the lagoon for the benefit of little, common and sandwich terns.

Hodbarrow is also renowned for large numbers of wildfowl during the winter, especially teal, wigeon, coot, mallard, tufted duck, common pochard, goldeneye, red-breasted merganser, and occasionally long-tailed duck, eider, goosander, pintail and shoveler.

References

External links
 RSPB Hodbarrow
Millom's premier information website
 Millom information website
The Cumbria Directory - Hodbarrow Nature Reserve

Nature reserves in Cumbria
Royal Society for the Protection of Birds reserves in England
Birdwatching sites in England
Iron mines in England
Mining in Cumbria